Nelapadu is a village in Guntur district of the Indian state of Andhra Pradesh. It is located in Tenali mandal of Tenali revenue division.

Government and politics 

Nelapadu gram panchayat is the local self-government of the village. The panchayat is divided into wards and each ward is represented by an elected ward member. The ward members are headed by a Sarpanch.

See also 
 List of villages in Guntur district

References 

Villages in Guntur district